Harpenden is a town and civil parish in the City and District of St Albans in the county of Hertfordshire, England. The population of the built-up area was 30,240 in the 2011 census, whilst the population of the civil parish was 29,448. Harpenden is a commuter town, with a direct rail connection through Central London and property prices well over triple the national average.

History

There is evidence of pre-Roman Belgic farmers in the area. In 1867 several items were found including a bronze escutcheon, rams-head shaped mounts, and a bronze bowl.

There are Roman remains in land around Harpenden, for instance the site of a mausoleum in the park at Rothamsted. A tumulus near the river Lea was opened in the 1820s and it contained a stone sarcophagus of Romano-Celtic origin. Five objects dating from around 150 AD, were inside including a glass jug with a Mediterranean stamp and samian ware dishes used for libations.

Up to the 13th century the area of the parish consisted of woodland with small hamlets and single farmsteads around cleared areas called "End" or "Green" and there are 19 Ends and 18 Greens in area of Harpenden and Wheathampstead parishes. Many of these still survive today.

Harpenden village grew out of Westminster Abbey's gradual clearing of woodland for farming and settlement within its Wheathampstead manor, granted by Edward the Confessor in 1060. A first reference to a parish church is in 1221 (where it is referred to as Harpendene) so it is inferred that the village grew up around then. The church of St Nicholas is the oldest church in the town, originally built as a Chapel of ease in 1217.

Just beyond the southern edge of the town lies Nomansland Common (sometimes simply called "No Man's Land") upon which part of the Second Battle of St Albans was fought during the Wars of the Roses. Nomansland Common also saw the first annually contested steeplechase in England, in 1830 when it was organised by Thomas Coleman, and the last fight of nineteenth century bare-knuckle fighter, Simon Byrne. It was also the haunt of the highwaywoman Lady Katherine Ferrers, better known as the "Wicked Lady".

A widespread but now little-known industry of Harpenden was straw-weaving, a trade mainly carried out by women in the nineteenth century. A good straw weaver could make as much as a field labourer. The straw plaits were taken to the specialist markets in St Albans or Luton and bought by dealers to be converted into straw items such as boaters and other hats or bonnets.

The arrival of the railway system from 1860 and the sale of farms for residential development after 1880 radically changed Harpenden's surroundings. First the Dunstable Branch of the Great Northern Railway passed through the Batford area with a station later named Harpenden East railway station (this line is now closed and forms a cycle track). Then the main line of Midland Railway was built in 1868 with a station near the main village which still exists today and the listed Southdown Road Skew Bridge nearby. The Harpenden and Hemel Hempstead Railway, known locally as the Nicky Line was opened in 1877.

Between 1848 and 1914 the common was a regular venue for horse racing. In his History of Hertfordshire in 1879, John Edwin Cussans commented "Notwithstanding that these meetings are under the most unexceptional patronage as regards the Stewards, yet for two days in the year all the London pickpockets, sharpers and blackguards who happen to be out of gaol are permitted to make Harpenden their own and to make travelling in a first-class carriage on the Midland Railway a danger to men and an impossibility to ladies." Golf has been played on the Common since 1894 and it was at that time Harpenden Golf Club was set up by a group of Harpenden people with the help and a financial contribution of 5 pounds from Sir John Bennet Lawes of Rothamsted Manor. The club moved to a new course at Hammonds End in 1931, at which time Harpenden Common Golf Club was formed by those who wanted to remain at the Common. In 1932 Bamville Cricket club was formed and shares part of the Common with the Golfers.

Harpenden is the home of  Rothamsted Manor and Rothamsted Research (formerly Rothamsted Experimental Station and later the Institute of Arable Crops Research), a leading centre for agricultural research. In front of its main building, which faces the common, is a stone, erected in 1893, commemorating 50 years of experiments by Sir John Bennet Lawes and Joseph Henry Gilbert..

Lawes inherited the family estate at Rothamsted in 1834. Acknowledged as "the father of agricultural science", his early field experiments on Hertfordshire farms led him to patent a phosphate fertiliser, the sales of which enriched him immensely. With the proceeds, he established the experimental station, building laboratories in the 1850s. The station continued the development of the artificial fertilisers on which most modern farmers now depend. Some of the long-term 'classical field experiments' begun by Lawes and Gilbert remain in place to this day (such as Broadbalk) representing a unique resource for agricultural and environmental research.

In 1913 the National Children’s Home moved to Harpenden with a large site Highfield Oval which was home to over 200 children. The site featured a print works, a carpenters’ and joiners’ shop, a bootmakers shop and a farm where boys undertook apprenticeships. Girls were mainly trained in domestic service with some being trained in sewing and office work. The children lived in a "family"  of 8-10 children each run by a sister or house mother. The chapel was gift from Joseph Rank and was built in 1928. The home was run on site until 1985. The site is now the head office of Youth with a Mission an international Christian missionary organization. The Harpenden Growth Study, one of the earliest longitudinal tests, was overseen by James Mourilyan Tanner and monitored the development of many of the children over a number of years.

During the Second World War, Harpenden was used to evacuate children from heavily bombed London. However, Harpenden was not totally confident in its safety, as evidenced by the now decaying Bowers Parade air raid shelters,  soon to be secured for the future. It has been suggested both that it be used for educational and emergency training purposes.

The Harpenden and District Local History Society has a collection of local material and archives which can be consulted, and holds regular meetings on topics of historical interest.

Geography
There are two civil parishes: Harpenden and Harpenden Rural.

As Harpenden is located in Hertfordshire, just outside London, it is an area of extremely high property costs; this is common in the region. Land Registry data suggests that the average house price in Harpenden in the 1st quarter of 2006 was £500,902, compared to £287,277 for the St Albans district generally and £183,598 nationally. The data also indicates that an unusually high proportion of houses in Harpenden are owner occupied (81.4%, as opposed to 69.6% in the district generally and 66.2% nationally).  The average price of a detached house is over £900,000 as of January 2012.

Harpenden has a large number of its streets named after English literary figures on the east side of the town (an area known, unsurprisingly, as the Poets' Corner), including Byron Road, Cowper Road, Kipling Way, Milton Road, Shakespeare Road, Spenser Road, Shelley Court, Tennyson Road, Townsend Road, Masefield Road and Wordsworth Road.

The River Lea flows through the Batford neighbourhood.

Governance
Harpenden was anciently part of the parish of Wheathampstead, in the hundred of Dacorum. The chapelry of Harpenden was treated as a separate civil parish from an early date, having its own church wardens and parish registers from the sixteenth century. An order to create a separate parish of Harpenden was made in 1656, but does not appear to have been carried out. Harpenden was eventually made a separate ecclesiastical parish in 1859.

From 1835 Harpenden was included within the St Albans Poor Law Union. As such, Harpenden became part of the St Albans Rural Sanitary District in 1872, which in turn became the St Albans Rural District under the Local Government Act 1894. The 1894 Act also created parish councils. Harpenden Parish Council held its first meeting on 31 December 1894, with Captain Arthur Lydekker, a Conservative, being elected the first chairman. The parish council held its meetings at the Harpenden Institute at 12 Southdown Road (then called Wheathampstead Road).

Shortly after the creation of St Albans Rural District, efforts began to make Harpenden an urban district. It was decided that the whole parish of Harpenden was not suitable to become an urban district, with the west of the parish remaining largely rural. As such, Harpenden was split into two parishes on 15 April 1898, called Harpenden Urban and Harpenden Rural. The Harpenden Rural parish remained part of St Albans Rural District, whilst the Harpenden Urban parish became independent as Harpenden Urban District. Arthur Lydekker, who had been chairman of the old Harpenden Parish Council, was appointed the first chairman of Harpenden Urban District Council.

Until September 1899, Harpenden Urban District Council held its meetings at the Harpenden Institute, as the parish council had done. On the opposite side of the Common was the British School on Leyton Road. The school had been built in 1850 but was vacated in 1897 when the school moved to new premises on Victoria Road. The council took a lease of the old British School from its owners, the Lawes family of Rothamsted, and the building was opened as the "Public Hall" in September 1899, acting as the council's meeting place and offices as well as providing a public hall.

In 1932 the council bought Harpenden Hall at 6 Southdown Road for £7,000 and converted it to act as offices and meeting place, moving into the building in early 1933. A new Public Hall was built in the former gardens of Harpenden Hall in 1938. The old public hall on Leyton Road became known as Park Hall.

The council was granted a coat of arms on 4 February 1949.

Harpenden Urban District Council was abolished under the Local Government Act 1972, becoming part of the new district of St Albans on 1 April 1974. A successor parish was created for the former urban district, called Harpenden Town Council. The town council continued to be based at Harpenden Hall until 1996, when it moved to a new Town Hall built as a rear extension to the urban district council's former home of Park Hall.

Transport

Harpenden railway station is served by Thameslink services on a frequent and fast rail link through central London. Suburban services stop at all stations on the route, while express services stop at St Albans City before continuing non-stop to London St Pancras. Trains run north to Luton and on to Bedford. From London St Pancras, trains continue south through major London interchanges, such as Farringdon and London Blackfriars, before continuing on to Brighton via Gatwick Airport, Sevenoaks or Wimbledon and Sutton. The rail link therefore gives direct access to Luton Airport (one stop north) and Gatwick Airport, taking approximately 1hr 10 m on a limited stops train.

The standard off-peak services are as follows:

The Nickey Line railway used to link Harpenden, Redbourn and Hemel Hempstead. It has since been converted to a path forming part of the National Cycle Network.

The A6 used to run through Harpenden, although the road numbering was changed to avoid congestion. The M1 runs nearby. The closest access to the M1 is Junction 9 at Redbourn & Dunstable or alternatively Junction 10 for Luton Airport.

A number of bus services pass through Harpenden. There are four main routes:

A fifth bus service, the Metroline 84A, which served Luton Airport, St Albans and stops to New Barnet, ceased running between Luton Airport and St Albans in April 2017.

Harpenden also has a Charity run Community Bus service called the Harpenden Hopper, which is a hail and ride service operating in various parts of the town; it is currently running 3 days a week (Tues, Weds and Thurs).

http://www.harpendenhopper.co.uk/

Economy

Harpenden is a prosperous town. In an analysis of the average income tax paid by constituency, Hitchin and Harpenden came tenth. In a list of the most valuable commuter areas compiled by Savills Research Harpenden came seventh. Good transport links to central London have been cited as a key factor.

Rothamsted Research, the largest agricultural research centre is based in Harpenden, it was founded in  1843.

Shopping

Harpenden has many shops commonly found in other English towns, with three central supermarkets (Sainsbury's, Marks and Spencer and Waitrose), multiple female clothes shops, charity shops, banks, estate agents and chemists. A good proportion of these are run by independent retailers. Cafes are also common in Harpenden, but with only two commercial chains (Costa Coffee and Caffè Nero); the rest are owned independently. There are multiple restaurants, mainly of Italian origin, and many pubs. Batford, Southdown, and Luton Road districts also have their own shopping areas.

Parks and commons

A notable feature of Harpenden is its abundant parks and commons. The central area of Harpenden is characterised by Church Green, Leyton Green and the High Street Greens, which give the town its provincial feel.

Today Harpenden Common hosts two cricket clubs, Harpenden Cricket Club, a Hertfordshire Premier League club that celebrated its 150 anniversary in 2013 and Bamville Cricket Club who play on Sundays on the golf course, a football club, bridle ways for horse riding, ramblers' paths and Harpenden Common Golf Club, all contained in an area of natural beauty which was awarded a national Green Flag Award in 2007. Harpenden Town Council is keen to help retain and maintain the environment and oversees habitat issues including bird and bat watching, the maintenance/regeneration of gorse, fungi and all the original wildlife (fauna and flora) for the benefit of the people of Harpenden.
Since 1894 Harpenden Common Golf Club has traditionally maintained a large part of the common and today works closely with Harpenden Town Council and Countryside management. This partnership has enabled the people of Harpenden to take full advantage of the common for all kinds of leisure activities, and the relationship of the golfers and others users has been excellent for many years.

In addition the town has large green public spaces available in Rothamsted Park, Batford Park, Kinsbourne Green, Lydekker Park and the Nicky Line which bisects the town.

Just to the south of Harpenden is the large expanse of Nomansland Common.

Education
Harpenden has several secondary schools:
St George's School, a coeducational Christian day and boarding school and specialist Technology, and Language College.
Sir John Lawes School, a specialist Media Arts College, Science College and Teacher Training college.
Roundwood Park School, a specialist Mathematics and Computing College and Language College.
Katherine Warington School, which opened in September 2019.

Harpenden has a number of state primary schools, including:
Manland Primary School
Crabtree Infants' and Junior Schools
Roundwood Primary School
The Grove Infant & Nursery and Junior Schools
High Beeches Primary School
Wood End School
Sauncey Wood Primary School
The Lea Primary School & Nursery
Harpenden Academy

It also has three private schools:
Aldwickbury School is an independent all-boys preparatory school (years Reception to 8).
The King's School is an independent Christian school (pre-school age to year 11).
St Hilda's School is an independent primary school for girls (years Reception to 6).

Twinning

Harpenden is twinned with:
  Cosne-Cours-sur-Loire, France
  Alzey, Germany

Miscellany
 Harpenden Lions Highland Gathering continues a tradition that began in 1946. The Gathering is held every July in Rothamsted Park and attracts typically 6,000 visitors. It claims to be the largest UK Highland Gathering outside of Scotland. It raises many thousands of pounds each year for charities nominated by Harpenden Lions Club who run the event.
 An annual classic car show, "Classics on the Common", is held on the 4th Wednesday in July attracting over 10,000 visitors and 1300 cars. One of the biggest events of its type in Europe, it is a free event, run by Rotary in Harpenden, with any profits collected going to charity.
The annual HERTS 10K run in aid of Rennie Grove Hospice Care takes place on the second Sunday in October. The event attracts thousands of runners and walkers making it one of the biggest 10k runs in Hertfordshire. The event starts and finishes at Rothamsted Research.

Notable residents
 Azeem Alam, BEM, doctor and entrepreneur, lives in Harpenden
Julian Bliss, international clarinettist and child prodigy was born and raised in Harpenden
 Steve Borthwick, former England and Saracens rugby captain lives in Harpenden
 Steve Bould, former professional footballer and current Arsenal assistant manager
 Ken Brown, who played in the Ryder Cup and is now a commentator for major golf competitions, such as the Open, grew up and still lives in Harpenden and is a member of Harpenden Common Golf Club
 Craig Charles, comedian and actor in Red Dwarf and Coronation Street and host of the Funk and Soul Show and Robot Wars lived in Harpenden.
 Ralph Chubb, poet, artist and printer was born here in 1892
 Dave Clarke, visually impaired Paralympic GB football captain.
 George W. Cooke, deputy director of Rothamsted Experimental Station
 Donald Coxeter, 20th century geometer attended St George's School
 Joanna Dennehy, serial killer responsible for the Peterborough ditch murders grew up in Harpenden.
 Matt Dickinson, Everest mountaineer, author, scriptwriter and director
 Lee Dixon, former Arsenal footballer
 Ferdinand Walsin Esterhazy, a spy for the German Empire, at the heart of the Dreyfus affair, fled from France in 1898 and lived in Milton Road until his death in 1923. He is buried in St Nicholas' churchyard under the false name of Jean de Voilemont.
 Siobhan Fahey, singer in Bananarama lived in Harpenden while she was 14 – 16. She attended Sir John Lawes School for those 2 years
 Andy Farrell, Saracens and England rugby player
 Owen Farrell, Rugby player for Saracens and a former member of St George's School
 Ronald Fisher, a statistician who almost single-handedly created the foundations for modern statistical science. worked at Rothamsted Experimental Station
 Ben Foden, Northampton Saints and England International Rugby Union player
 Charles Henry Gimingham (1923–2018), botanist, was born in Harpenden
 Miles Golding, classical musician and violinist of Split Enz
 Martin Gore from the band Depeche Mode
 Laura Haddock actress who appeared in Guardians of the Galaxy and other films, went to school in Harpenden
 Mick Harford former England international footballer and manager. Currently working for Luton Town Football Club, whom he has previously managed.
 Una Healy, singer from The Saturdays
 Richard Herring, Comedian and podcaster, living in Harpenden while London home is renovated
 Steve Hewlett, (1958 - 2017), former presenter of The Media Show on BBC Radio 4
 George Hogg, British journalist who rescued 50 orphaned children in China during the Japanese occupation
 Charlie Hutchison, British communist, liberator of Belsen concentration camp, and only black British International Brigades volunteer. Spent several years in an orphanage in Harpenden.
 Frank Ifield, Australian singer and yodeller lived in Harpenden
 Guy Johnston, cello soloist and winner of BBC Young Musician of the Year in 2000
 John Keane, artist, was born here and grew up in Wordsworth Road. 
 Stanley Kubrick, filmmaker, lived and died in nearby Childwickbury Manor
 Henry Lawson, Australian writer, lived in 'Spring Villa', Cowper Rd, Harpenden from July–September 1900
Joe Lenzie Music producer and DJ was born in Harpenden and attended Sir John Lawes School
Terry Lightfoot, Jazz clarinettist, ran the Three Horseshoes pub for five years during the late 1970s
 Andy Linighan, former Arsenal footballer lived in Bewdley Close, Southdown
 James Mardall (1899–1988), first-class cricketer and British Army officer
 Doug McAvoy, former General Secretary of the National Union of Teachers lived in Harpenden between 1975 - 1990
 Joan Moore, botanist (1920–1986)
 Eric Morecambe, comedian, lived in Harpenden, close to his beloved Luton Town FC. His funeral and burial took place in St Nicholas Church. The Public Halls are named after him
 Albert Moses, an actor who starred in Mind Your Language playing Punjabi student Ranjeet Singh and a number of James Bond films
 John Motson, Football commentator
 Spencer Pickering (1858–1920), Chemist, retired to Harpenden following a chemical accident, one of five Royal Society Fellows in the town at that time. 
 Tim Rice, the composer, attended Aldwickbury School
 David Richardson, music producer, audio engineer, musician and founder of Sound Recording Technology, was born and lives in Harpenden
 David Roberts (born 1942), cricketer
 David Sharp (mountaineer), mountaineer who died near the summit of Mount Everest
 Tim Sherwood, former Tottenham Hotspur and Blackburn Rovers player who lived in Harpenden during his coaching days at Tottenham
 Christopher Smith (MP) (d. 1589), owner of Annables Manor in Harpenden.
Sir Robert Stephen John Sparks CBE FRS, eminent volcanologist, was born in Harpenden. His former PhD student Prof Claire Horwell also grew up in Harpenden. 
 Christopher Strauli, actor, who starred in Only When I Laugh and Full House was born in Harpenden
 Dame Ellen Terry, actress 1847–1928, who lived in Harpenden from 1868 to 1874
 Camilla Tominey, journalist
 Katherine Warington, research botanist, 1897–1993, born and lived in Harpenden; worked at Rothamsted Experimental Station
 Jack Wilshere West Ham and England international footballer
 Sir John Wittewronge, owned and lived at Rothamsted Manor, where in the seventeenth century he kept a weather and gardening diary which has very early records of rain, temperature and winds
 Ashley Young, former Manchester United and England international footballer
 Richard Youngs alternative musician, grew up in the town and recorded several albums there, especially Lake and Advent

Culture 
Harpenden Public Halls was a 410-seat live music and theatre venue in the town centre. It was replaced in 2021 with the newly built Eric Morecambe Centre in nearby Rothamsted Park which is a 511-seat multi function space. The Public Halls site will be reused for housing.

Harpenden is also home to Musicale, a music school and music shop on the site of St George's School providing instrumental and vocal training to adults and children. It runs several orchestras and bands.

Other music groups based in Harpenden include The Lea Singers, Hardynge Choir, Magic Voices, Harpenden Choral Society, Music Makers, Harpenden Concert Band and Harpenden Musical Theatre Company.

Sport
Harpenden is home to various sports clubs. Just a selection are listed below:
 Harpenden Cricket Club
 Harpenden Town Football Club
 Harpenden Rugby Football Club
 Elliswick Lawn Tennis Club
 Harpenden Lawn Tennis Club
 Harpenden Dolphins Cricket Club
 Bamville Cricket Club
 Harpenden Colts Football Club
 Harpenden Hockey Club
 Harpenden Golf Club
 Harpenden Common Golf Club
 Harpenden Swimming Club
 Harpenden (Lawn) Bowling Club
 Harpenden Arrows Running Club 
 Skew Bridge FC 
 Harpenden Rovers Football Club
 Harpenden Forastero Cycling

Voluntary organisations
 Harpenden Lions Club
 Harpenden Village Rotary Club
 Round Table
 Probus
 Ladies' Circle
 Lea Singers

Scouting and Guiding in Harpenden
There is scouting in Harpenden. Scout groups fall under the heading of the "Harpenden and Wheathampstead District Scouts".

As well as taking part in a number of volunteer roles and marching in both the Remembrance and St George's Day parades, they are involved in the Harpenden and Wheathampstead District Scout Gang Show, an annual variety show. The Harpenden Gang Show is the world's longest continuously running Gang Show, with a performance every year since 1949.

There are also several Guide units in Harpenden. Guides take part in the Remembrance Sunday and St George's Day parades alongside the Scouts and has younger counterparts called Rainbows and Brownies.

Freedom of the Town
The following people and military units have received the Freedom of the Town of Harpenden.

Military Units
 The Royal Anglian Regiment: 12 September 2013.

Gallery

References

External links

Harpenden Town Council
Harpenden History, Local History Society website
Old Harpenden, Years Gone By - Local History Community Group

 
City of St Albans
Towns in Hertfordshire
Civil parishes in Hertfordshire